Kearny Airport , sometimes called Kearny Municipal Airport, is a public-use airport located  south of the Central business district of Kearny, in Pinal County, Arizona, United States. In 2003 the airport received the Arizona Department of Transportation's Airport of the Year award.

Facilities and aircraft 
It has one runway:

For the 12-month period ending April 22, 2008, the airport had 2,400 general aviation aircraft operations, an average of seven per day. At that time there were four aircraft based at this airport: three single-engine and one ultralight.

References

External links 

 

Airports in Pinal County, Arizona